Shubham Chaubey (born 15 October 1995) is an Indian cricketer. He made his Twenty20 debut for Uttar Pradesh in the 2015–16 Syed Mushtaq Ali Trophy on 8 January 2016.

References

External links
 

1995 births
Living people
Indian cricketers
Uttar Pradesh cricketers
Cricketers from Varanasi